Louis-Édouard Garrido (1893–1982) was a French painter.

Biography
Louis-Édouard Garrido was a French painter, the son of Spanish artist Leon Eduardo Garrido. Established in Normandy, Louis-Édouard Garrido painted superb landscapes in the area of Saint-Vaast, as well as portraits and still lifes. The artist has been the director of the Beaux Arts school of Caen (Normandy), as well as the curator of the Musée des beaux-arts in Caen. Louis Edouard Garrido was also the president of the artist association of Lower Normandy.

Notes

Artworks
 the Port of St.Vaast-la-Hougue
 Nature morte aux groseilles (still-life with berries)
 Autoportrait au chapeau (self-portrait with hat)

Sources
 Official website of the City of St-Vaast

1893 births
1982 deaths
People from Saint-Maur-des-Fossés
20th-century French painters
20th-century French male artists
French male painters
Modern painters
French people of Spanish descent
19th-century French male artists